Charles IV, Duke of Anjou, also Charles of Maine, Count of Le Maine and Guise (1446 – 10 December 1481) was the son of the Angevin prince Charles of Le Maine, Count of Maine and Isabelle of Luxembourg.

He succeeded his father as Count of Maine, Guise, Mortain and Gien in 1472. He succeeded his uncle René I of Naples in 1480 as fourth Duke of Anjou and Count of Provence, according to the will of René, who had no surviving son. René's surviving daughter Yolande received Bar and was already Duchess of Lorraine.

He also used the title of Duke of Calabria, in token of the claims to Naples he inherited from René.

In 1474 he married Joan of Lorraine (1458 – 25 January 1480), daughter of Frederick II of Vaudémont, but they had no children. He died on 10 December 1481.

He willed his inheritance to his cousin Louis XI of France, whose heirs thus obtained a claim to the affairs of Italy, pursued in the next decades.

Notes

References

See also
Counts and Dukes of Anjou
Counts and Dukes of Maine
Counts of Provence
Dukes of Guise

1446 births
1481 deaths
House of Valois-Anjou
Dukes of Anjou
Counts of Guise
Dukes of Calabria
15th-century peers of France